Danny Mrwanda (born 6 April 1983) is a Tanzanian international footballer who plays as a striker for Mbeya Kwanza.

Career
Mrwanda has played in Tanzania for Arusha and Simba, in Kuwait for Al Tadamon, and in Vietnam for Đồng Tâm Long An and Ðà Nẵng before returning home in 2014.

He made his international debut for Tanzania in 2005, and has appeared in FIFA World Cup qualifying matches for them.

References

1983 births
Living people
People from Arusha District
Tanzanian footballers
Tanzania international footballers
People from Arusha Region
Simba S.C. players
Al Tadhamon SC players
Polisi FC players
Lipuli F.C. players
Kagera Sugar F.C. players
Maji Maji F.C. players
Tanzanian expatriate footballers
Expatriate footballers in Kuwait
Tanzanian expatriate sportspeople in Kuwait
Expatriate footballers in Vietnam
Tanzanian expatriate sportspeople in Vietnam
Association football forwards
Kuwait Premier League players
Tanzanian Premier League players